Christenson is a Scandinavian patronymic surname, and an anglicized form of the Danish Christensen. It is believed to originate from the personal name "Christen".  Notable people with the surname include:

Andrew B. Christenson (1869–1931), American educator
Chris Christenson (1875–1943), American figure skater
Dave Christenson (1963–2017), American singer, one half of the pop duo Stabilizers
Fred Christenson, American television executive and poker player
Gary Christenson (mayor), American politician
Gary Christenson (baseball) (born 1953), American baseball player
John N. Christenson, United States Navy admiral
Irma Christenson (1915–1993), Swedish actress
Larry Christenson (born 1953), American baseball player
Ryan Christenson (born 1974), American baseball player

See also
Christensen (surname)
Kristensen

Patronymic surnames